Major General Sir George Kenneth Scott-Moncrieff  (3 October 1855 – 4 June 1924) was a Scottish soldier and engineer.

Early life
Scott-Moncrieff was born in Bengal, British India, the younger son of Maj. Alexander Pringle Scott-Moncrieff, of the 44th Bengal Infantry, and of Elizabeth Hastie Coventry, younger daughter of the Rev. George Coventry, of Shanwell, Kinross-shire. His father was the second of seven sons born to Robert Scott Moncrieff (1793–1869); his younger brother was the distinguished engineer Sir Colin Scott-Moncrieff  (1836–1916).

Career
Scott-Moncrieff joined the Royal Engineers in 1873 and served in Afghanistan from 1878–1880. He was an Instructor at the School of Military Engineering from 1893–1898. He was Commander of the Royal Engineers, China Expeditionary Force 1900–1901, taking part in the relief of Peking and the Waziristan expedition on the North West Frontier, India 1901–1902.

He was Assistant Director, Fortifications and Works, Army Headquarters 1909–1911, and Director, Fortifications and Works, War Office 1911–1918. He was promoted to the rank of major-general on 1 October 1912, following the retirement of Major-General Richard M. Ruck. He retired in 1918.

He was appointed a Companion of the Order of the Indian Empire in 1901 for services in China, a Companion of the Order of the Bath in the 1907 Birthday Honours and a Knight Commander of the Order of the Bath (KCB) in the 1915 Birthday Honours. He was appointed a Knight Commander of the Order of St Michael and St George (KCMG) in 1918 for valuable services rendered in connection with the War.

Selected works

; vol. 1 (1897); vol. 2 (1898)

References

Royal Engineers officers
British Army generals of World War I
1855 births
1924 deaths
Knights Commander of the Order of the Bath
Knights Commander of the Order of St Michael and St George
Companions of the Order of the Indian Empire
Military personnel of British India
British Army personnel of the Boxer Rebellion